More Party Time is an album by jazz tenor saxophonist Arnett Cobb recorded in 1960 for the Prestige label.

Reception
The AllMusic review awarded the album 4½ stars and called it "melodic, soulful, and swinging. An excellent if brief (at 36 minutes) effort".

Track listing 
All compositions by Arnett Cobb except as indicated
 "Lover, Come Back to Me" (Oscar Hammerstein II, Sigmund Romberg) - 8:57   
 "Blue Lou" (Irving Mills, Edgar Sampson) - 3:41   
 "Swanee River" (Stephen Foster) - 5:52   
 "Down by the Riverside" (trad) - 5:22   
 "Blue Me" - 7:36   
 "Sometimes I'm Happy" (Irving Caesar, Vincent Youmans) - 5:13  
Recorded at Van Gelder Studio in Englewood Cliffs, New Jersey, on February 16 (tracks 1–3, 5 & 6) and February 17 (track 4), 1960.

Personnel 
 Arnett Cobb - tenor saxophone
 Tommy Flanagan (tracks 1–3, 5 & 6), Bobby Timmons (track 4) - piano
 Sam Jones - bass
 Art Taylor - drums
 Danny Barrajanos (tracks 1–3, 5 & 6), Buck Clarke (track 4) - congas

References 

Arnett Cobb albums
1960 albums
Albums produced by Esmond Edwards
Albums recorded at Van Gelder Studio
Prestige Records albums